Saint Severus of Vienne (died c. 455) was a priest who evangelised in Vienne, France. He is venerated as a Catholic saint. Severus is said to have been Indian by birth and of wealthy origins. His entry in the Roman Martyrology reads: 

Severus settled in Vienne around 430. He founded a church in honour of St. Alban (now the church of Saint-Alban-du-Rhône) near Vienne. He died in Italy, but his body was brought back to Vienne and buried in the church dedicated to the protomartyr St. Stephen, which he himself had constructed.

Notes

References

Further reading
 
 

French Roman Catholic saints
French people of Indian descent
Indian Christian saints
5th-century Christian saints